Shock troops or assault troops are formations created to lead an attack. They are often better trained and equipped than other infantry, and expected to take heavy casualties even in successful operations.

"Shock troop" is a calque, a loose translation of the German word Stoßtrupp.  Assault troops are typically organized for mobility with the intention that they will penetrate enemy defenses and attack into the enemy's vulnerable rear areas.  Any specialized, elite unit formed to fight an engagement via overwhelming assault (usually) would be considered shock troops, as opposed to "special forces" or commando-style units (intended mostly for covert operations). However, both types of units could fight behind enemy lines, by surprise if required.

Although the term "shock troops" became popular in the 20th century, the concept is not new, and Western European armies in past centuries called them the forlorn hope.  Presently, the term is rarely used, as the strategic concepts behind it have become standard contemporary military thinking.

Before 1914 
The Companion cavalry of Alexander the Great are described as being the first example of shock cavalry being used in Europe.

Several sources describe how the Vikings used Berserkers as shock troops in organized warfare.

The Shorn Ones were the most prestigious warrior society in the Aztec Empire, serving as its shock troops.

Knights Templar were considered shock troops.

In late-medieval Europe, the German Landsknecht and Swiss mercenaries used large Zweihänder swords to break into pike formations. Polish Winged Hussars, elite heavy cavalry used by the Polish–Lithuanian Commonwealth, have also been described as shock troops. The Ottoman Army used Deli as shock troops as well.

Grenadiers originated as specialized assault soldiers for siege operations. First established with a distinct role in the mid- to late-17th century, grenadier units would throw grenades and storm breaches, while leading the forefront of a breakthrough. Even after abandoning the use of the original black-powder grenade, armies retained the grenadier companies and regiments as specialist assault troops.

During the Paraguayan War (1864–1870), in which Paraguay fought against Brazil, Argentina, and Uruguay, the Paraguayans deployed shock troops (composed of a mixture of dismounted cavalry and fit men who could row and swim) armed with sabres, cutlasses, knives, bayonets, pistols, and hand grenades. They attacked small fortified positions and boarded Brazilian river steamers.

World War I

During the First World War, many combatants faced the deadlock of trench warfare.  On the Western Front in 1915, the Germans formed a specialized unit called the Rohr Battalion to develop assault tactics.  During the Brusilov Offensive of 1916, the Russian general Aleksei Brusilov developed and implemented the idea of shock troops to attack weak points along the Austrian lines to effect a breakthrough, which the main Russian Army could then exploit.  The Russian Army had also formed hunter commando units in 1886, and used them in World War I to protect against ambushes, to perform reconnaissance and for low-intensity fights in no-man's-land.

The von Hutier tactics (infiltration tactics) called for special infantry assault units to be detached from the main lines and sent to infiltrate enemy lines, supported by shorter and sharper (than usual for WWI) artillery fire missions targeting both the enemy front and rear, bypassing and avoiding what enemy strong points they could, and engaging to their best advantage when and where they were forced to, leaving decisive engagement against bypassed units to following heavier infantry. The primary goal of these detached units was to infiltrate the enemy's lines and break their cohesion as much as possible. These formations became known as Stoßtruppen, or shock troops, and the tactics they pioneered were the basis of post-WWI infantry tactics, such as the development of fire teams.

Notwithstanding the postwar status of the Storm Troopers in German service, the same sort of tactical doctrine was widely espoused in British and French service in late 1917 and 1918, with variable results. The British Army standard training manual for platoon tactics, SS 143, was used from February 1917 onwards and contained much of what was standard for German shock troops. According to Ward, the Australian and Canadian divisions deployed amongst British forces in France quickly came to be regarded as the best shock troops in the Allied ranks due to their ferocity in battle, and were employed accordingly. US forces were trained in tactics by surviving French cadre from chasseur units, and were trained to use French Chauchat light machine guns and rifle grenades.

World War II

During the Second World War, the Red Army of the Soviet Union deployed five shock armies between 1941 and 1945. Many of the units, which spearheaded the Soviet offensives on the Eastern Front from the Battle of Stalingrad (1942–1943) to the Battle of Berlin (1945), were shock armies. Shock armies had high proportions of infantry, engineers, and field artillery, but with less emphasis on operational mobility and sustainability. Soviet shock armies were characterized by a higher allocation of army-level artillery units to break German defense positions by weight of fire, and often had heavy tank regiments or heavy self-propelled gun regiments to add additional direct fire-support. Once a shock army had made a breach in an enemy tactical position, more mobile units such as tank and mechanized corps would insert themselves through the shock army's positions with the mission of penetrating deep into the enemy rear area. By the end of the war, though, Soviet guards armies typically enjoyed superior artillery support to that of the shock armies.

Shock armies were instrumental in the execution of deep operation (also known as Soviet deep battle – , glubokaya operatsiya). The central composition of the deep operation was the shock army, each acting either in cooperation with each other or independently as part of a strategic front operation. Several shock armies would be subordinated to a strategic front.

Well-known shock armies include the 2nd Shock Army, which spearheaded several offensives in the Leningrad area, and the 3rd Shock Army, which played a key role in the Battle of Berlin.

A Soviet ad hoc combat group was a mixed-arms unit of about 80 men in assault groups of six to eight men, closely supported by field artillery. These tactical units were able to apply the tactics of house-to-house fighting that the Soviets had been forced to develop and refine at each Festungsstadt (fortress city) they had encountered from Stalingrad to Berlin.

The Yugoslav Partisans also established "shock" units during World War II, commencing in February 1942. These initially formed as company- and battalion-sized units, and later grew into brigades.

In or amongst the German armed forces, large armies such as the Waffen-SS received training with the best gear and weapons, primarily used to hit weak points. The Waffen-SS also served as a heavy unit. Used to smash well-armed and -equipped armies on the Eastern Front, the Waffen-SS lost its efficacy after Kursk (1943), but nevertheless later fought in many theaters and played a role in the Battle of the Bulge (1944–1945).

After 1943 (particularly during and after the invasion of Italy), specialist British units, such as the Commandos and certain detachments of the Special Air Service were used as shock troops against well dug in or elite German forces. Again, both forces would be used in similar roles after the Allies crossed the Rhine, serving as a vanguard for British forces.

After World War II
The demands of infantry fighting in the Second World War erased much of the romance of shock troops, particularly when any well-trained infantry was capable of the same tactics, especially in a formal assault on a well-defended objective.  The Soviets retained the term shock (although the term can also be translated as strike) as a designation for armies involved in assaulting the enemy's operational depth as part of Soviet deep battle doctrine.

See also
 Australian and New Zealand Army Corps
 Canadian Corps
 Ghatak Platoon
 Special forces
Deli (Ottoman troops)

References

Further reading
  Grau, Lester W. Russian-Manufactured Armored Vehicle Vulnerability in Urban Combat: The Chechnya Experience, Red Thrust Star, January 1997 "The Chechen lower-level combat group consists of 15 to 20 personnel subdivided into three or four-man fighting cells. ..."
 Штабс-ротмистр Танеев. О штурмовых частях Германской и Австро-Венгерской армий / Битва Гвардий - https://btgv.ru/history/rare/staff-rotmistr-taneyev-about-the-assault-units-of-the-german-and-austro-hungarian-armies/
Infantry
Special forces
Types of military forces